Seedfeeder is a pseudonymous illustrator known for contributing sexually explicit drawings to Wikipedia. Between 2008 and 2012, the artist created 48 depictions of various sex acts. Seedfeeder's illustrations garnered mixed reactions: some Wikipedia editors claimed they contained racist and sexist undertones, while Andy Cush of Gawker called him "Wikipedia's greatest artist of sex acts". Artnet columnist Paddy Johnson listed Seedfeeder's work as one of the "Top 10 Digital Artworks of 2014".

Work
Seedfeeder contributed 48 drawings of various sex acts to 35 English-language Wikipedia articles; these have also been used in other language editions of Wikipedia. They are available for adaptation and reuse under the conditions of a Creative Commons license. The images are vector graphics with gradient colors and neutral backgrounds; Seedfeeder said that he lacked the skills to make complex backgrounds. The simplified and "sterile" style of the artwork has been compared to that of aircraft safety cards. He contributed drawings to the following Wikipedia articles, among others:

 Anal sex
 Anilingus
 Bukkake
 Cum shot
 Cunnilingus
 Deep-throating
 Doggy style
 Erotic lactation
 Facial (sex act)
 Fellatio
 Fingering (sexual act)
 Fisting
 Frot
 Gokkun
 Gonzo pornography
 Mammary intercourse
 Missionary position
 Pegging (sexual practice)
 Sex position
 Tea bag (sexual act)
 Threesome
 Top, bottom and versatile
 Tribadism
 Woman on top

Seedfeeder retired from Wikipedia in June 2012.

Reception

General reactions

Seedfeeder's images received media coverage in numerous languages and publications. In 2014, Gawker's Andy Cush published an article about Seedfeeder's "frank, graphic" illustrations, and a companion gallery called "The Best of Seedfeeder, Wikipedia's Greatest Sex Illustrator", which he described as a collection of the artist's "greatest works". In his Gawker piece, Cush called Seedfeeder "Wikipedia's greatest artist of sex acts" and his work "unmistakable" and "nearly as striking as [the] subject matter". Cyriaque Lamar of Cracked.com called the images "goddamn hilarious" and also compared them to airline safety pamphlets. Lamar acknowledged their educational value but criticized them for being too pornographic for pedagogical purposes. The Cracked.com article included a gallery of the six "most terrifying sex illustrations on Wikipedia".

HuffPost Andres Jauregui said the illustrations were "anything but shy" and that "by rendering intense acts of coupling in a sterile, almost instructional manner, Seedfeeder's drawings have a normalizing effect on bedroom play that some might consider taboo". He wrote that the sexual acts Seedfeeder illustrates "aren't weird, but the plastic, detached style in which they're rendered is bizarrely matter-of-fact, like the airline safety pamphlets that the illustrator says inspired them". Furthermore, he said: "Some wouldn't consider it art, but it's not porn, either. The drawings are educational, but they serve a purpose beyond illustration." Artnet columnist Paddy Johnson listed Seedfeeder's work as one of the "Top 10 Digital Artworks of 2014".

Negative reactions

Seedfeeder's drawings were also met with controversy. Some Wikipedia contributors perceived racist and sexist undertones, resulting in the removal of some images from English-language Wikimedia projects. A depiction of a facial featuring a black man ejaculating onto a white woman prompted criticism, with some users claiming that the image was racist and promoted violence against women.

Seedfeeder responded to those who argued that descriptions of sex acts without accompanying images would be best by saying: "I come from a philosophical viewpoint that every Wikipedia article should have all forms of media available associated with it. Images, audio, and video. All articles, without exception. So any argument predicated on 'an image isn't necessary' is one that carries absolutely zero weight. None." In an interview with NaTemat, sexologist  defended the images, saying that images of sexual activity are nothing new and that people should not be offended by sex.

Seedfeeder also responded to criticism that children could discover his illustrations by writing, "if your children are actively searching for these kind of topics... it's because they already have a slight idea of them... and they feel ready to know more."

See also
 List of Wikipedia people

References

External links

 Seedfeeder's pre-retirement English Wikipedia user page and retirement announcement

Illustrators
Obscenity controversies in art
Online obscenity controversies
Pseudonymous artists
Sexuality in arts
Wikimedia image contributors
Wikipedia people